Hubert Deschamps (13 September 1923 – 29 December 1998) was a French actor.

He was the son of the museum curator Paul Deschamps (1888–1974) and uncle of the French stage director Jérôme Deschamps.

Selected filmography 

 The Strollers (1950)
 Street Without a King (1950) - Le monsieur qui vend son assiette (uncredited)
 Bernard and the Lion (1951) - François, le domestique du baron
 Atoll K (1951) - Le fonctionnaire (uncredited)
 Les amours finissent à l'aube (1953)
 Les hommes ne pensent qu'à ça (1954) - L'homme fortuné / Un marcheur
 Les Impures (1954) - Le gendarme à l'hôtel Stella (uncredited)
 Papa, Mama, the Maid and I (1954) - Le spectateur qui n'a pas dîné (uncredited)
 Stopover in Orly (1955) - Un douanier
 French Cancan (1955) - Isidore, le garçon de café (uncredited)
 Fernand cow-boy (1956) - Le maire
 Short Head (1956) - Le serveur 'Gay Paris'
 L'ami de la famille (1951)
 Nous autres à Champignol (1957)
 Comme un cheveu sur la soupe (1957) - Le banquier
 On Foot, on Horse, and on Wheels (1957) - Robichet
 Les Espions (1957) - Un espion dans l'auberge (uncredited)
 Amour de poche (1957) - L'inspecteur
 Mam'zelle Souris (1957)
 Elevator to the Gallows (1958) - Le substitut du procureur
 En bordée (1958)
 Le Sicilien (1958) - Le voyageur Allemand
 Les motards (1959) - Le brigadier Plochut
 Bobosse (1959) - Le souffleur
 The Bureaucrats (1959) - Le curé dans le train
 Les affreux (1959) - Pomaret
 La marraine de Charley (1959) - Le vendeur de voitures
 Le travail c'est la liberté (1959) - Le brigadier
 Pantalaskas (1960) - Rabiniot
 Lovers on a Tightrope (1960) - Carconi
 Murder at 45 R.P.M. (1960) - Le vendeur d'autos
 La 1000eme fenêtre (1960) - Dumas
 Zazie dans le Métro (1960) - Turandot
 The Fenouillard Family (1961) - Le maître d'école
 La peau et les os (1961)
 The Nina B. Affair (1961) - Romberg
 Les livreurs (1961) - L'inspecteur
 Auguste (1961) - Le récitant (uncredited)
 Arsène Lupin contre Arsène Lupin (1962) - Le ministre
 Tartarin de Tarascon (1962) - Ladévèze
 Three Fables of Love (1962) - L'avocat (segment "Le corbeau et le renard")
 Une blonde comme ça (1963)
 Don't Tempt the Devil (1963) - Dr. Mermet
 The Fire Within (1963) - D'Averseau
 Your Turn, Darling (1963) - Henri Grant
 Le cheval de bataille (1963)
 La Bonne Soupe (1964) - Un client de Marie-Paule (uncredited)
 Dandelions by the Roots (1964) - Général Fréderic Cédille
 Les durs à cuire ou Comment supprimer son prochain sans perdre l'appétit (1964) - Robert Darsac
 Patate (1964) - Adrien
 La chance et l'amour (1964) - Deschamps (segment "Chance du guerrier, La")
 Male Companion (1964) - Le curé (uncredited)
 The Great Spy Chase (1964) - Le douanier (uncredited)
 Les copains (1965) - Le député-maire Cramouillat
 Me and the Forty Year Old Man (1965) - Le directeur du journal (uncredited)
 La corde au cou (1965) - Le patron
 Les Bons Vivants (1965) - Le juge Hardouin (segment "Bons vivants, Les")
 Le Dimanche de la vie (1967) - Bourrelier
 Bang Bang (1967) - Le client mécontent (uncredited)
 Demeure chaste et pure (1967)
 Le tatoué (1968) - Le professeur Mortemont
 Un merveilleux parfum d'oseille (1969) - Le patron d'Yves
 Macédoine (1971)
 Comptes à rebours (1971) - Le concierge / Janitor
 L'ingénu (1972) - Le bailly
 Trop jolies pour être honnêtes (1972) - Le droguiste
 Na! (1973) - L'évêque
 Le Magnifique (1973) - Le vendeur
 The Holes (1974) - L'abbé Lestinguois
 Gross Paris (1974) - Le généralissime
 The Mouth Agape (1974) - Roger le père, 'Le Garçu'
 Le Trio infernal (1974) - Detreuil
 Zig Zag (1975) - Jean Mortagne
 Serious as Pleasure (1975) - L'homme au restaurant
 La Soupe froide (1975) - Delaville
 Le mâle du siècle (1975) - Hubert
 Soldat Duroc, ça va être ta fête! (1975) - Le père de Nicole
 C'est dur pour tout le monde (1975) - Martin
 Chobizenesse (1975) - Taffarel
 On a retrouvé la 7ème compagnie ! (1975) - Le pharmacien
 Bartleby (1976) - Le gérant
 Tendre Poulet (1977) - Charmille
 Solveig et le violon turc (1977)
 La Zizanie (1978) - Le concierge de l'hôtel
 Coup de tête (1979) - Le directeur de la prison
 Rue du Pied de Grue (1979) - Rachafort
 Démons de midi (1979) - Le réceptionniste à Lyon
 Le Roi et l'oiseau (1980) - Le sentencieux (voice)
 Les sous-doués (1980) - Léon Jumaucourt
 The Lady Banker (1980) - Le commissaire à Meudon
 T'inquiète pas, ça se soigne (1980) - Siméon
 Inspector Blunder (1980) - Inspecteur Marcel Watrin
 Les surdoués de la première compagnie (1981) - Médecin-major
 L'amour trop fort (1981) - Jean Dumaine
 San-Antonio ne pense qu'à ça (1981) - Pinuche
 Pourquoi pas nous? (1981) - L'ophtalmo
 Prends 10000 balles et casse-toi (1981)
 Les Sous-doués en vacances (1982) - Surgeon
 Salut... j'arrive! (1982) - Le directeur de la banque
 Ça va faire mal (1982) - Henri Marcel / Dieu
 Prends ton passe-montagne, on va à la plage (1983) - Pépé
 Ça va pas être triste (1983) - Le médecin / The doctor
 Waiter! (1983) - Armand
 Un bon petit diable (1983) - Boxear
 Next Summer (1985) - Le voisin de Paul
 Tranches de vie (1985) - Le prisonnier
 Adieu Blaireau (1985) - L'ivrogne bar Colette
 Y'a pas le feu... (1985) - Le curé
 Vive le fric (1985) - Gaston Leblanc
 Association de malfaiteurs (1987) - Uncle Gadin
 À notre regrettable époux (1988) - L'imprimeur
 La septième dimension (1988)
 Corps z'a corps (1988) - Le commissaire de police
 Bonjour l'angoisse (1989) - M. Robert
 À deux minutes près (1989) - Chotard
 Mona et moi (1989)
 Un jeu d'enfants (1990) - Pujol
 Stranger in the House (1992) - Beaupoil
 Le Voyage à Paris (1999) - Le vendeur de chaussures

1923 births
1998 deaths
Male actors from Paris
French male stage actors
French male film actors
French male television actors
20th-century French male actors